Tikhonovka is a rural locality (a village) in Korneyevsky Selsoviet, Meleuzovsky District, Bashkortostan, Russia. The population was 59 as of 2010. There is 1 street.

Geography 
Tikhonovka is located 59 km northwest of Meleuz (the district's administrative centre) by road. Nordovka is the nearest rural locality.

References 

Rural localities in Meleuzovsky District